Rameshwar Broota (born 1941, New Delhi) is an Indian visual artist. His work revolves around sustained exploration of the body and its vulnerabilities. He is known for his unique Scratch technique.

Early life 
Broota was born in 1941 in Delhi an art-oriented family. He graduated in fine arts from the Delhi College of Art in 1964. His parents were singers and his brothers were visual artists.

Exhibitions 

 Man Series, Digital Exhibition, September 2020
 Scripted in Time, Vadehra Art Gallery, February 2018
Visions of Integrity: Interrogating the male body, Kiran Nadar Museum of Art, January 2015
Scripted in Time II, February 2019

Collections 
 Kiran Nadar Museum of Art
Museum Kunstpalast
National Gallery of Modern Art

Awards and recognition 

 Ranked second in Hurun India Art List 2020.

References 

21st-century Indian artists
Living people
1941 births